Frank Mirahmadi [born ] is a thoroughbred horse racing announcer. He has called at major tracks including Hialeah, Turf Paradise, Louisiana Downs, Oaklawn Park, Monmouth Park, Golden Gate Fields, Aqueduct, and Santa Anita Park.

Mirahmadi grew up near Santa Anita Park and attended Beverly Hills High School and graduated from The University of Arizona. His father was a big racing fan and took his son to the track at a very young age. By age 9, Mirahmadi was highly interested in the sport of kings.

Mirahmadi called his first live race at Hollywood Park on December 24, 1992. In 1996, Mirahmadi got his first full-time announcers job at Hialeah in Florida. He is well known for his imitations of celebrities and other thoroughbred race callers. From a young age, he imitated many announcers, including Dave Johnson, Harry Henson and Trevor Denman. He  used 23 voices in a race call at Turf Paradise in 2009.

Mirahmadi has also been a television analyst for the major horse racing network TVG Network and has done handicapping shows for Oaklawn Park, Monmouth Park and NYRA.

Mirahmadi was hired as the new permanent race caller at Santa Anita Park starting with the 2019 winter meet. He will split announcing duties between Santa Anita and Monmouth.

References

1967 births
Living people
American horse racing announcers